The 12527 / 28 Ramnagar - Chandigarh Junction Intercity Express is a Express express train belonging to Indian Railways North Eastern Railway zone that runs between  and  in India.

Coaches
The 12527 / 28 Ramnagar - Chandigarh Junction Intercity Express has one AC Chair Car, five Non AC chair car, two general unreserved & two SLR (seating with luggage rake) coaches . It does not carry a pantry car coach.

As is customary with most train services in India, coach composition may be amended at the discretion of Indian Railways depending on demand.

Service

Routing

Traction
As the route is going to be electrified, a   based WDM-3A diesel locomotive pulls the train to its destination.

References

External links
12527 Intercity Express at India Rail Info
12528 Intercity Express at India Rail Info

Intercity Express (Indian Railways) trains
Rail transport in Uttarakhand
Rail transport in Uttar Pradesh
Rail transport in Haryana
Rail transport in Chandigarh